Am seidenen Faden is the second studio album by German recording artist Tim Bendzko, released by Sony Music Columbia on 24 May 2013 in German-speaking Europe. Bendzko re-teamed with frequent collaborator music producer Swen Meyer to work on the album and also consulted Crada to provide additional production on the songs.

Track listing
All songs produced by Swen Meyer.

Charts

Weekly charts

Year-end charts

Certifications

Release history

References

External links
 

2013 albums
Tim Bendzko albums